The Star of the Republic of Indonesia is Indonesia's highest order awarded to both civilians and the military for their merits to the republic and the people. It was officially instituted in 1959.

It is awarded to a person who has given extraordinary service to the integrity, viability, and greatness of Indonesia. As the highest order of the Republic, its grand master is the President of Indonesia, who after his/her inauguration is bestowed upon with the collar and medal of the "" class. The Vice President of Indonesia, after their inauguration, is also bestowed upon with the collar and medal of the "" class.

Classes
The order is awarded in five classes.

Recipients of the Star of the Republic of Indonesia wear the star on a sash and a breast star on the left chest.

Prior to 1972, only Bintang Republik Indonesia Adipurna recipients wore the star on a sash. Recipients of the Bintang Republik Indonesia Adipradana wore the star on a ribbon which was worn around the neck. Both of Adipurna and Adipradana classes wore a breast star on the left chest. Recipients of the Bintang Republik Indonesia Utama, Pratama and Nararya wore the star on a ribbon on the left chest; with rosette for the Pratama class.

Recipients of the 1st Class

Recipients of the 2nd Class

See also
 Orders, decorations, and medals of Indonesia

References

Orders, decorations, and medals of Indonesia
Awards established in 1959